Richard Sutcliffe may refer to:
Richard Sutcliffe (engineer) (1849–1930), Irish-born mining engineer and inventor
Richard Sutcliffe (cricketer) (born 1954), English cricketer
Rick Sutcliffe (born 1956), baseball player
Dick Sutcliffe (1918–2008), animator